CILA-FM is a Canadian radio station that broadcasts religious programming at 88.1 FM in Cookshire-Eaton, Quebec. The station was licensed in 1995  and is owned by the Roman Catholic Archdiocese of Sherbrooke through la Fabrique de la Paroisse Saint-Camille-de-Cookshire.

References

External links
 

Ila
Ila
Ila
Catholic radio stations
Radio stations established in 1995
1995 establishments in Quebec